Neosho Hugh Robinson Airport  is a city-owned public-use airport located three nautical miles (6 km) south of the central business district of Neosho, a city in Newton County, Missouri, United States.

Facilities and aircraft 
It has one asphalt paved runway designated 1/19 which measures 5,001 by 100 feet (1,524 x 30 m).

For the 12-month period ending February 27, 2008, the airport had 3,110 aircraft operations, an average of 259 per month: 93% general aviation, 6% air taxi and 1% military. At that time there were 43 aircraft based at this airport: 79% single-engine, 9% multi-engine and 12% helicopter.

References

External links 
 
 

Airports in Missouri
Buildings and structures in Newton County, Missouri